Souleymane Mamam (born 20 June 1985) is a Togolese former professional footballer who played as an attacking midfielder or a winger. He played for Royal Antwerp, K.R.C. Mechelen, and Nejmeh SC. His brother Chérif Touré Mamam was also a footballer.

Club career
Born in Lomé, Togo, Mamam played for local clubs in Lomé before signing for English club Manchester United in 2003. However, work permit regulations meant that it was not possible for Mamam to play in the United Kingdom and he was sent on loan to play at Royal Antwerp until he was eligible for a Belgian passport. At the end of the 2006–07 season, after four seasons of playing on loan for Antwerp, Manchester United decided not to renew his contract.

Having become a free agent, Mamam then signed a new one-year permanent deal with Royal Antwerp in time for the start of the 2007–08 season. He went on trial at Motherwell – who declined to sign Mamam in favour of another defender – and Birmingham City, but again failed to secure a deal due to work permit problems. He also went on trial with Toronto FC in the MLS in January 2010, before joining Belgian Third Division A team K.R.C. Mechelen until the end of the 2009–10 season.

Mamam returned to Manchester United on trial in August 2011, and played in a friendly for the club's reserve team against Morecambe on 1 August; he was substituted in the 53rd minute for Jesse Lingard, who scored the team's second goal in a 2–0 win. He then scored after 11 minutes of the reserves' next game against Llanelli at Parc y Scarlets on 8 August, but was substituted in the 58th minute.

He played for Nejmeh SC, after having been released by K.R.C. Mechelen in July 2010.

International career
According to official FIFA records, on 6 May 2001, Mamam became the youngest player to ever play a World Cup qualifier when he played for the Togo national team against Zambia at the age of 13 years and 310 days. FIFA records give Mamam's date of birth as 30 June 1987; however, various websites, including the official website of Royal Antwerp, give 20 June 1985, which would mean he was in fact almost 16 when he played his first match for Togo and even older than American Samoan Ben Falaniko, who played his first international match aged 15 years and 217 days.

References

External links
 

1985 births
Living people
Sportspeople from Lomé
Togolese footballers
Association football midfielders
Togo international footballers
Belgian Pro League players
Challenger Pro League players
Lebanese Premier League players
CO Modèle de Lomé players
Manchester United F.C. players
Royal Antwerp F.C. players
K.R.C. Mechelen players
Nejmeh SC players
Togolese expatriate footballers
Togolese expatriate sportspeople in Belgium
Expatriate footballers in Belgium
Togolese expatriate sportspeople in England
Expatriate footballers in England
Togolese expatriate sportspeople in Lebanon
Expatriate footballers in Lebanon
21st-century Togolese people